The 1991–92 Australian region cyclone season saw several intense storms. It was also an event in the ongoing cycle of tropical cyclone formation. It ran from 1 November 1991 to 30 April 1992. The regional tropical cyclone operational plan also defines a tropical cyclone year separately from a tropical cyclone season, and the "tropical cyclone year" ran from 1 July 1991 to 30 June 1992.

Tropical cyclones in this area were monitored by four Tropical Cyclone Warning Centres (TCWCs): the Australian Bureau of Meteorology in Perth, Darwin, and Brisbane; and TCWC Port Moresby in Papua New Guinea.

Seasonal summary

Systems

Severe Tropical Cyclone Graham 

On 2 December, a south-southwestly moving low pressure system formed. Within 24 hours, an eye developed. Shortly thereafter, Graham turned towards the southeast due to influence of a deep-layer anticyclone to the east. Maximum intensity was reached at 1500 UTC 5 December as a Category 5 system. As the cyclone tracked away from Cocos Island, it encountered less favorable conditions. By 0000 UTC 8 December, the low-level circulation became fully exposed on the northwest side of the deep convection. Graham weakened below cyclone intensity at 1800 UTC 9 December and became devoid of convection the next day.

Tropical Cyclone Mark 

Tropical cyclone Mark formed within the monsoon trough in the Timor Sea, west of Melville Island, on 6 January. The system tracked rapidly eastwards across northern Australia, entering the Gulf of Carpentaria at 1200 UTC 7 January. Once over water, satellite imagery indicated that the system slowly organized and by 0600 UTC 8 January, whilst approaching the central Gulf of Carpentaria, it was upgraded into a Category 1 cyclone. Upon naming, Mark slowed and adopted a slightly northeastward track in response to enhanced ridging to the south. This track was maintained for the next 40 hours and at 2100 UTC 9 January, Mark crossed the western coast of Cape York Peninsula just south of Weipa. Mark soon weakened as it crossed the peninsula and was downgraded to a tropical depression at 1200 UTC 10 January. Mark dissipated later that day. Weipa sustained minor, but widespread damage with failing trees often being a consequence for damage to houses and power lines. High waves brought $3.5 million (AUD) damage to the Weipa port.

Severe Tropical Cyclone Betsy 

A deep depression formed from gale-force westerlies on 5 January. The depression continued to intensify as it drifted slowly west and became a Category 1 cyclone the next day. During the next 12 hours, Betsy rapidly intensified while moving south-southeast slowly. Mean winds associated with the cyclone reached storm-force late on 7 January and the system turned to the southwest and subsequently the cyclone approached the central Vanuatu Islands. By 1800 UTC 8 January, Besty developed hurricane-force winds. Six hours later, the core of the cyclone struck the islands of Ambrym and Malakula in central Vanuatu while developing a large ragged eye. By 11 January, Besty had become less organized. Meanwhile, the eye shrunk and became ragged. was losing organisation, with the large eye (diameter of 165 km) rapidly shrinking and becoming elongated and ragged. Midday 11 January, Betsy recurved sharply to the south and by 13 January Betsy had dissipated. However, the extratropical remnants passed close to the northern coast of New Zealand on 17 January. Tropical cyclone Betsy was blamed for significant damage in Vanuatu and was responsible for the deaths of two people. The worst impact was felt on Efate, where there was a  storm surge.

Severe Tropical Cyclone Daman 

A tropical depression formed in the south Pacific on 11 February. The system steadily developed, and was named Daman on 15 February. Twelve hours later, the cyclone skirted Vanua Lava before passing northwest of Espiritu Santo. After emerging into Coral Sea, Cyclone Daman began curving to the southwest, and then south-southwest. On 17 February, it peaked in intensity as a Category 3 cyclone. The system began weakening shortly thereafter as environmental shear increased, and by Daman was no longer a tropical cyclone. Soon afterwards, the extratropical remnants turned rapidly eastwards, bringing gale-force winds to parts of the North Island of New Zealand. Significant tree damage and downed power lines were reported in Auckland.

Severe Tropical Cyclone Harriet-Heather 

The low rapidly intensified under favorable conditions, and at 0600 UTC 25 February, the system was named. Initially, Harriet moved towards the islands, passing just south of North Keeling Island early on 27 February.

The tropical cyclone weakened somewhat during the following next three days while continuing west. An approaching frontal system from the west resulted in Harriet re-curving to the south on 4 March. The storm continued to weakening due to strong wind shear. Harriet started to accelerate to the southeast on 6 March. The cyclone passed  to the southwest of Cape Leeuwin in southwest Western Australia during the evening of 8 March. Shortly after that, Harriet lost tropical features.

Harriet brought minor property damage on the island, but significant horticultural losses. Overall, damage was assessed at $600,000 (1992 AUD).

Severe Tropical Cyclone Ian 

Another depression developed in the monsoon trough the further east of Harriet-Heather, roughly  due south of Java. Unlike Harriet, this cyclone initially tracked east in response to a high amplitude upper trough located to the west. Under a favorable environment, the system was named Ian later that day. After re-curving to the south, Ian continued to intensify and on 0900 UTC 1 March, Ian bottomed out in intensity with  winds. Although Ian began weakening as it approached the Western Australian coast, it was still a severe cyclone as it tracked directly over the Monte Bellos Islands and Barrow Island. Ian dissipated the next day.

Effects from the system were mostly limited to the islands offshore. In the Monte Bellos, a mine was extensively damaged. Due to a  storm surge, a landing stage on Barrow Island sustained minor damage. On the Australian mainland, damage from the storm was minimal.

Severe Tropical Cyclone Esau 

Esau moved into the Australian region and brought gale-force winds to the Solomon Islands during 29 February. However, Esau moved back into the South Pacific basin and started to weaken the next day.

Severe Tropical Cyclone Fran 

Fran moved into the region during 11 March as a Category 3 severe tropical cyclone, and peaked with 10-minute sustained winds of 145 km/h (90 mph).

In preparation of the storm, officials closed beaches along the Sunshine and Gold Coasts. In addition, train services from Brisbane were cancelled. Across Queensland, coastal towns were flooded, uprooting trees and knocking out power. Several roofs were torn off of homes and some flooding was reported. Winds and flooding caused minor property damage, but considerable crop losses along were reported the coast, with the worst effects in Bundaberg. A total of 40 houses were uproofed throughout Bundaberg. In Burnett Heads, 3 yachts were damaged. Heavy swells caused damage on Heron Island and severe erosion on the Gold and Sunshine Coasts. Overall, 2,624 insurance claims were made because of property damage. Total damage from the system was 8–10 million (1992 AUD), while insurance losses were estimated at $2.5 million (1992 AUD).

Severe Tropical Cyclone Neville 

A major surge of the Madden–Julian oscillation in early April resulting in the development of a tropical depression on 4 April near the Tanimbar Islands. At first, the depression drifted slowly southeast in an environment of low shear. By 0600 UTC 6 April, the circulation was well-defined and south to come under the influence of a deep easterly steering current generated by the subtropical ridge over inland Australia; at 0200 UTC 7 April, the depression re-curved to the southwest and was classified as a tropical cyclone. Despite its close proximity to land, Neville intensified rapidly due to its small size. Roughly 24 hours after being named, the storm attained hurricane-force winds. The cyclone continued deepening as it tracked into the central Timor Sea, reaching its peak intensity of 200 km/h (125 mph) around 1800 UTC 8 April.

Shortly after its peak, Cyclone Neville slowed down response to the passage of a trough. After undergoing a small counterclockwise loop, the system resumed its track to the southwest. It weakened slowly. By 10 April, the eye of the cyclone had collapsed and increased winds shear caused the storm to become less organized. At 0800 UTC 11 April, sustained winds associated with Neville went below hurricane force and the cyclone stalled. Due to a combination of wind shear and cold water, and by 0200 UTC 13 April, Neville had dissipated, though the remnant low-level circulation was apparent for two more days as it drifted away to the southwest.

In preparation of the cyclone on the Tiwi Islands, shipping was delayed and travel by air was cancelled. An oil rig supply boat was forced up on the beach by the winds, and 14 people were airlifted from the BHP rig Challis Venture. When Neville struck the islands only minor damage was reported. A few homes lost their roofs, trees were uprooted and power was knocked out. In addition, 14 people were airlifted when an oil rig was forced up the beach by high winds. Damage on Australia associated with Serve Tropical Cyclone Neville was restricted to the northwestern portion the Northern Territory though widespread tree damage occurred and a camp was destroyed on Melville Island.

Severe Tropical Cyclone Jane-Irna 

Over the next few days the low moved towards the southeast and gradually developed further, before TCWC Perth named it Jane as the low had developed into a category 1 tropical cyclone.

As the storm continued to track south, it came under the influence of a deep-layer easterly steering flow caused by the presence of a ridge to the south. Jane turned onto a westward track which it maintained for nearly five days. Cyclone Jane continued to intensify under an ideal environment. On 13 April, a well-defined eye appeared on satellite imagery.

Over the ensuing 24 hours, tropical cyclone Jane began to weaken in response to increased vertical wind shear in association with a mid-latitude trough. By 15 April, the eye had become cloud-filled, and at 0000 UTC 16 April, the cyclone began to re-curve to the southeast and subsequently rapidly deteriorated. By 0100 UTC 17 April, Jane was no longer a tropical cyclone. Due to the storm's small size, winds of just  were reported Cocos Island. Therefore, there were no reports of damage or deaths.

Other systems 
During that day, the low gradually developed further as it moved towards the southeast and an anticyclonically curved upper level jet stream, before during the JTWC reported that the low had become equivalent to a tropical storm and assigned it the designation 18P. However, during the next day despite gale-force winds persisting in the systems southern quadrants, the system moved onto the central Queensland coast, before it could become a tropical cyclone. As a result of the low moving inland, the JTWC issued their final advisory on the system later that day, however, the system continued to be monitored until it was absorbed into the Australian inland heat trough.

Season effects 

|-
| Graham || 2–10 December || bgcolor=#|Category 5 Severe tropical cyclone || bgcolor=#|235 km/h (145 mph) || bgcolor=#|915 hPa (27.02 inHg) || None || None || None || None ||
|-
| Mark || 7–10 January || bgcolor=#|Category 2 tropical cyclone || bgcolor=#|100 km/h (60 mph) || bgcolor=#|980 hPa (28.94 inHg) || Northern Territory, Queensland || 3.50 || 3.60 || None ||
|-
| Betsy || 10–14 January || bgcolor=#|Category 3 Severe tropical cyclone || bgcolor=#|165 km/h (100 mph) || bgcolor=#|950 hPa (28.05 inHg) || Vanuatu || Unknown || Unknown || 2 ||
|-
| 16S || 13–13 January || bgcolor=#|Tropical depression || bgcolor=#|45 km/h (30 mph) || bgcolor=#|1004 hPa (29.65 inHg) || None || None|| None || None ||
|-
| Daman || 17–19 February || bgcolor=#|Category 3 Severe tropical cyclone || bgcolor=#|165 km/h (100 mph) || bgcolor=#|965 hPa (28.50 inHg) || New South Wales || Unknown || Unknown || None ||
|-
| 18P || 19–20 February || bgcolor=#|Tropical low || bgcolor=#|65 km/h (40 mph) || bgcolor=#|997 hPa (29.44 inHg) || Queensland || Unknown || Unknown || None ||
|-
| Harriet-Heather || 24 February – 8 March || bgcolor=#|Category 4 Severe Tropical Cyclone || bgcolor=#|210 km/h (130 mph) || bgcolor=#|930 hPa (27.46 inHg) || Western Australia || 0.06 || 0.06 || None ||
|-
| Ian || 27 February – 4 March || bgcolor=#|Category 5 Severe tropical cyclone || bgcolor=#|210 km/h (130 mph) || bgcolor=#|930 hPa (27.46 inHg) || Western Australia || Minimal || Minimal || None ||
|-
| Esau || 29 February – 1 March || bgcolor=#|Category 4 Severe tropical cyclone || bgcolor=#|185 km/h (115 mph) || bgcolor=#|925 hPa (27.32 inHg) || Solomon Islands || Unknown || Unknown || None ||
|-
| Fran || 11–17 March || bgcolor=#|Category 3 Severe tropical cyclone || bgcolor=#|150 km/h (90 mph) || bgcolor=#|950 hPa (28.05 inHg) || Queensland || 10.00 || 10.28 || 5 ||
|-
| Neville || 7–13 April || bgcolor=#|Category 5 Severe tropical cyclone || bgcolor=#|205 km/h (130 mph) || bgcolor=#|945 hPa (27.91 inHg) || Northern Territory, Western Australia|| Minor || Minor || None ||
|-
| Jane-Irna || 8–13 April || bgcolor=#|Category 4 Severe tropical cyclone || bgcolor=#|210 km/h (130 mph) || bgcolor=#|930 hPa (27.46 inHg) || None || None || None || None ||
|-

See also 

Tropical cyclones in 1991 and 1992
 1991–92 South-West Indian Ocean cyclone season
 1991–92 South Pacific cyclone season
 Atlantic hurricane seasons: 1991, 1992
 Pacific hurricane seasons: 1991, 1992
 Pacific typhoon seasons: 1991, 1992
 North Indian Ocean cyclone seasons: 1991, 1992

References 

 
Australian region cyclone seasons
Articles which contain graphical timelines